Agglomération d'Agen is an agglomeration community, an administrative entity, in the Nouvelle-Aquitaine, in southern France. Administrative center: Agen. It was further expanded in January 2022 by the merger of the community of communes Porte d'Aquitaine en Pays de Serres.

The agglomeration community of Agen covers 44 communes, and has a population of approximately 104,000. It is the largest agglomeration community in Lot-et-Garonne.

Communes
The 44 communes:

Agen
Astaffort
Aubiac
Bajamont
Beauville
Blaymont
Boé
Bon-Encontre
Brax
Castelculier
Caudecoste
Cauzac
Colayrac-Saint-Cirq
Cuq
Dondas
Engayrac
Estillac
Fals
Foulayronnes
Lafox
Laplume
Layrac
Marmont-Pachas
Moirax
Le Passage
Pont-du-Casse
Puymirol
Roquefort
Saint-Caprais-de-Lerm
Sainte-Colombe-en-Bruilhois
Saint-Hilaire-de-Lusignan
Saint-Jean-de-Thurac
Saint-Martin-de-Beauville
Saint-Maurin
Saint-Nicolas-de-la-Balerme
Saint-Pierre-de-Clairac
Saint-Romain-le-Noble
Saint-Sixte
Saint-Urcisse
Sauvagnas
La Sauvetat-de-Savères
Sauveterre-Saint-Denis
Sérignac-sur-Garonne
Tayrac

References

External links
 www.agglo-agen.net (in French)

Agen
Agen